Bondoc Ionescu-Crum (3 April 1915 – 24 June 1994) was a Romanian athlete and a football defender and manager.

Life and career
Bondoc Ionescu-Crum was born in the Bulgarian commune Bregovo to Romanian parents. When he was a little child, his family settled in Brașov where he attended the Andrei Șaguna College. In 1934, at the Inter-school Competitions that took place on the Câmpia Libertății from Blaj, he won five races and set a new national record in the long jump, jumping 7.03 meters. He won the title of vice-champion of the same event at the Balkan Games in Istanbul the following year. Ionescu-Crum competed in the men's long jump at the 1936 Summer Olympics. He was also a footballer, playing as a defender for Sportul Studențesc București and Venus București, winning the Divizia A title with Venus in the 1938–39 season, playing 7 games in the campaign. He fought for the Romanian Armed Forces in World War II being injured and having achievements for which he was decorated. After World War II, Ionescu-Crum became a football manager, coaching Universitatea Craiova, Tractorul Brașov and Hidromecanica Brașov. He received post-mortem the Honorary Citizen of Brașov title, also having a street in the city named after him.

Honours

Military decorations
Crucea Comemorativă a celui de-al Doilea Război Mondial 1941–1945 (World War II Commemorative Cross 1941-1945) (1955)

Player
Venus București
Divizia A: 1938–39
Cupa României runner-up: 1939–40

Manager
Universitatea Craiova
Divizia C: 1957–58

References

External links
 

1915 births
1994 deaths
Athletes (track and field) at the 1936 Summer Olympics
Romanian male long jumpers
Olympic athletes of Romania
Romanian footballers
Association football defenders
FC Sportul Studențesc București players
Venus București players
Liga I players
Romanian football managers
CS Universitatea Craiova managers
Romanian people of World War II
Romanian military personnel of World War II